Kombu is a 2020 Indian Tamil-language horror comedy film, written and directed by E Ibrahim. The film features Lollu Sabha Jeeva, Disha Pandey, Pandiarajan, Ganja Karuppu, Swaminathan, Gayathri, Ambani Shankar, and Nellai Shiva. It was released on 11 December 2020.

Plot 
A student, who discovers that people are using cow horns to tackle ghosts and spirits in a village, which is when she decides to visit the area along with her colleagues. During their stay, they encounter supernatural events that relate to horns. What occurs next forms the crux of the story.

Cast 
 Lollu Sabha Jeeva as Karthick
 Disha Pandey as Janani
 Pandiarajan as Tata (Karthick's Uncle)
 Swaminathan as Pasupathi
Ganja Karuppu 
 Ambani Shankar
Nellai Siva

Soundtrack 
Lyrics were written by E Ibrahim, Devguru, Krithika Gokulnath, Venkatesh Prabhakar

References

External links 
 

2020s Tamil-language films
2020 films
2020 comedy horror films
Indian comedy horror films